Simon Shelton (13 January 1966 – 17 January 2018), also known as Simon Barnes, was an English actor.

Early life
Shelton was born in the Bethnal Green area of London on 13 January 1966.

Career
Shelton was best known for his children's television work, most notably as Dark Knight on Incredible Games from 1994 to 1995 and Tinky-Winky on Teletubbies from 1997 to 2001.

Personal life
Shelton was married to Emma Robbins. They had three children and lived in Ampthill, Bedfordshire. Shelton's niece is actress Emily Atack.

Death
Shelton had a history of alcoholism. On 17 January 2018, four days after his 52nd birthday, he was found dead in a well near the Port of Liverpool Building in Liverpool. His cause of death was hypothermia and he had a high concentration of alcohol in his system.

References

External links
 

1966 births
2018 deaths
Male actors from London
British male television actors
British television presenters
Deaths from hypothermia
Alcohol-related deaths in England
People from Bethnal Green
20th-century British male actors